Atiba Jefferson (born November 30, 1976) is an American photographer and skateboarder.

Photography career 
Jefferson has photographed skateboarding extensively for over 20 years, working for skate magazines such as Slap, Thrasher, Juxtapoz, Transworld, and many others. Atiba is currently a staff photographer for Thrasher Magazine.  In addition to skateboarding photography, Jefferson works as a commercial photographer shooting portraiture and lifestyle advertisements for clients such as the NBA, Nike, and many others. In addition to skateboarding photography, Jefferson has an interest in basketball and music photography.

Jefferson was featured in the video game Tony Hawk's Pro Skater 4.

References

External links 
https://www.atibaphoto.com/
Crailtap's Mini Top 5 with Atiba Jefferson
Atiba Jefferson - Instagram - atibaphoto

American photographers
Living people
1976 births
American skateboarders
African-American skateboarders
Skateboarding mass media
Skateboarding
Skate photographers
Sports photographers
African-American photographers
21st-century African-American sportspeople
20th-century African-American sportspeople